Nicholas F. "Nick" Benton (born February 9, 1944) is the founder, owner, and editor of the Falls Church News-Press, a weekly  newspaper distributed free in Falls Church, Virginia, and in parts of Fairfax County, Arlington County, and Washington D.C.

Benton has served twice as the president of the local Chamber of Commerce, been named Falls Church's "Pillar of the Community" twice and "Business Person of the Year" once. He has authored a weekly national affairs column in his periodical since the 1990s, and his support for gay rights put him on the cover of Metro Weekly as “Citizen Nick” in 2007.

Life and work

Born in Ross, California, Benton earned a degree in English from Westmont College (a Christian college)) in 1965. After college he was a reporter and sports writer for the Santa Barbara News-Press.[2] He obtained a master of divinity degree in 1969 from the Pacific School of Religion in Berkeley, California. He became a contributor to the underground newspaper Berkeley Barb. Enjoying the alternative weekly’s freedom to publish on counterculture subjects from women’s liberation to rock music, Benton helped found the Berkeley Gay Liberation Front and wrote the first editorial for the newspaper Gay Sunshine. 
While working for the Barb, Benton decided to come out with his gay identity—just before the 1969 Stonewall Riot in New York’s Greenwich Village that launched the gay rights movement. His articles, he later wrote, “promoted the notion that fully actualized, gay liberation had the potential to be socially transformative.” As a moonlighter, Benton co-produced a pair of issues of his own fledgling gay newspaper, The Effeminist.

Lyndon LaRouche organization

Benton worked for the Lyndon LaRouche organization from 1974 until the late 1980s, first as a political organizer, and later as the Washington D.C. bureau chief and White House Correspondent for LaRouche's Executive Intelligence Review. In 2022, Benton would write that in the 1970s he fell “gradually into the nasty cultist climate of that unfortunate decade, becoming for a time a sad tool of the late cult leader, the pro-Moscow” LaRouche. “But I left that organization with extreme prejudice long ago, careful to elude the great howls of protest that someone who broke free elicited from the leadership.”
He founded the Falls Church News-Press in March 1991, and in March 2021 celebrated the periodical's 1,560th weekly edition. Its front-page slogan: “The City of Falls Church’s Independent, Locally Owned Paper of Record, Serving Northern Virginia.” The paper—originally written largely by Benton himself--combines small-town booster coverage of schools, parades and city government with development controversies and national commentary for the audience of many federal employees and tech executives. Benton is an active philanthropist. His paper has donated funds for college scholarships for local Meridian High School students as well as support for the school’s anti-bullying campaign and the scoreboard for its ball park. He helped found the Diversity Affirmation Education Fund of the Falls Church Education Foundation. He was named an “Outstanding Virginian” by Equality Virginia in 2012.

Personal life

Benton has been married and divorced three times; he has no children.  His third wife lives in Falls Church.

Works
 Length:  344 pages.
 An 11-page mimeographed pamphlet. Several sources ascribe this work to 1971, although Benton himself says he wrote it in 1970.
 Length: 15 pages.
 Length:  8, [3] leaves.
 Transcript: 26 leaves. Tape: 1 cassette.

Notes

References

.
Benton, Nicholas F. (2007). "How I Explain LaRouche", Falls Church News-Press, June 27, 2007.
Bergholz, Richard. "Labor Party Candidate Seeks GOP Aid," Los Angeles Times, March 14, 1978.
Elfman, Lois, "Community Voice," The Scene magazine, February 2006.
.
PR Newswire, "Falls Church News-Press Owner Nicholas F. Benton Donates $10,000 to Falls Church City Schools to Establish Ground-Breaking 'Diversity Affirmation Education Fund'," May 2, 2005.

Pearce, Katie, "Washington Blade Staffers Plan New Venture After Gay Weekly Folds," The Washington Current, Nov. 18, 2009.
Metro Weekly, Oct. 14, 2010.
Mansberger, Terry, "LGBT Democrats Earn a Seat at the Party," Falls Church News-Press, Dec. 30, 2010.
Osborne, William (1986). "Democrats now take LaRouche seriously", San Diego Union, March 23, 1986.

External links
Personal website
Biography
Benton Communications, Inc.

Living people
American LGBT rights activists
Activists from the San Francisco Bay Area
Westmont College alumni
1944 births
American newspaper reporters and correspondents
LaRouche movement
Virginia Democrats
People from Ross, California
American anti-war activists